The Cascades Railroad ran for about  on the north bank of the Columbia River around the Cascades Rapids. The owner was the Oregon Steam Navigation Company. The railroad operated as a portage around the rapids.

History
Francis A. Chenoweth built a wooden tramway using mules on the north bank of the river in 1851.  He sold the tram way to Daniel and Putnam Bradford who incorporated it as the Cascades Railroad.  The Great Flood of 1862 (which began in November 1861) swept away the tramway.  It was rebuilt as railroad by the Oregon Steam Navigation Company and returned to operation with two steam locomotives named "ANN" and "BETSY" on April 20, 1863.  The railroad was  broad gauge from 1860 to 1880,  standard gauge from 1880 to 1883, and  narrow gauge from 1883 until the close of operations.  One of its five small locomotives, No. 7, was sold in 1900 to the Ilwaco Railway and Navigation Company.

See also
Oregon Portage Railroad

Notes

3 ft gauge railways in the United States
Defunct Washington (state) railroads
Portages in the United States
5 ft gauge railways in the United States